The Helliconia trilogy is a series of science fiction books by British writer Brian W. Aldiss, set on the Earth-like planet Helliconia. It is an epic chronicling the rise and fall of a civilisation over more than a thousand years as the planet progresses through its incredibly long seasons, which last for centuries.

The trilogy consists of the books Helliconia Spring (published in 1982), Helliconia Summer (1983), and Helliconia Winter (1985).

Synopsis
In one sense, the central character is not any person (though some families are focused on,  such as Yuli the Priest's line, which dominates Helliconia Spring) but the planet itself and its science, particularly in the light of James Lovelock's Gaia Hypothesis. The books describe realistic and credible details of the planet from the perspectives of a great variety of fields of study – astronomy, geology, climatology, geobiology, microbiology, religion, society, and many others – for which Aldiss gained the help of many Oxford academics. Connections are drawn which show numerous ways in which these aspects of life affect each other.

The books are set some six thousand years in the future. A space station from Earth, the Avernus, is orbiting Helliconia and closely observing the planet, including the activities of its intelligent inhabitants. The temptation to interfere in Helliconian affairs is a recurring dilemma for the inhabitants of Avernus.

Helliconia has a very long year (called the "great year"), equivalent to some 2500 Earth years, and global temperatures vary greatly over this period. A major theme of the trilogy is the fragility of human civilisation in the context of environmental changes, and the ability of humanity to preserve and recreate civilisation. Phenomena related to the changing of the seasons of the Great Year provide a deus ex machina plot device in the climax of each of the three books (the exploding trees at the end of Spring which allow the heroes to escape a phagor attack, the migrating fish at the end of Summer which allow the heroes to escape from an invading army, and the marauding phagors at the end of Winter which allow Luterin to escape from his captors).

Helliconia is populated by two intelligent races, humans and phagors. Helliconian humans are not the same species as Earth humans, having evolved entirely independently, but are remarkably similar in appearance, intellect, behaviour, and culture.

Earth
Since the present day, the humans of Earth have been through an era of space exploration. This proved to be largely disappointing: faster than light travel was proven to be impossible, and few planets were found with life beyond the microbial stage. The one great success was the discovery of Helliconia. The Avernus was dispatched to monitor but not interfere with Helliconia, providing the Earth with scientific data and the entertainment of an epic reality show.

Somewhat later, the human race destroyed itself and most other life on Earth with a nuclear war. After a thousand years or so, the Earth's Gaian repair mechanisms repopulated the world with new life, including a small number of humans, who now live a simple nomadic life and have no interest in technology.

Avernus
The massive space station Avernus is visible from the surface of Helliconia as a bright, fast-moving "star". There are also thousands of probes and other monitoring devices on the planet, providing scientific readings, video pictures, etc., which Avernus collects and transmits to Earth.

Six thousand people, the descendants of the original crew, live on Avernus in a small but comfortable high-technology environment. After the nuclear war, transmissions from Earth stop suddenly for no reason apparent to the residents of Avernus. The space station continues with its work for many centuries, but eventually its isolated people descend into madness and sexual perversion (a common theme in Aldiss's works, which he treats with revulsion rather than salaciousness). By the end of the trilogy, Avernus is a lifeless, empty shell.

Humans cannot survive long on the alien biome of Helliconia, due to viruses, preventing the crew from engaging long on the surface or escaping the station en masse.

Helliconia

Astronomy
Helliconia lies in a loose binary star system, which consists of a yellow-orange dwarf similar to the Sun, Batalix (spectral class G4), and a hotter and brighter white star, Freyr (Type A supergiant). Helliconia orbits Batalix, which in turn orbits Freyr. The Batalix-Freyr system is supposedly in the constellation of Ophiuchus, about a thousand light years from Earth. In real life, the closest system similar to Helliconia may be Wolf 1061c.

Helliconia orbits Batalix in 480 days; this is called the "small year". Each day of the small year comprises 25 hours, each of 40 minutes, which in turn are each 100 seconds long. Helliconia and Batalix's orbit around Freyr, the "great year", is highly elliptical and takes approximately 1,825 small years, equating to some 2,592 Earth years. At periastron Batalix is 236 astronomical units from Freyr, whilst at apastron is 710 AU distant. A Helliconian week is eight days. There are six weeks in a tenner, and ten tenners in a Helliconian small year. While seasonal changes in the small year are slighter than those of Earth, the long seasons of the great year are much more marked. When distant from Freyr, Batalix's illumination is sufficient only to maintain ice-age conditions. However, Freyr's output is many times greater than Batalix's, so as Helliconia approaches Freyr, the tropics of Helliconia become hotter even than the tropics of Earth.

Previously Helliconia only orbited Batalix, but the Helliconia-Batalix system was captured by Freyr's gravitational pull about eight million Earth-years ago (i.e., very recently by astronomical and evolutionary standards).  The Freyr stellar system originally consisted of two stars, but during the encounter by Batalix, the sister-star of Freyr was thrown out of the system, along with one of Batalix's original planets and Helliconia's moon.

Geography
Helliconia is 1.28 Earth masses in size, making it somewhat larger than Earth and with a bigger axial tilt of 35 degrees. This means that small-year seasons are harsher, but the planet still has huge polar ice caps, capable of surviving even the great summer, and the human-habitable surface area is comparable to that of Earth.

There are three continents, a tropical continent (Campannlat), a northern continent (Sibornal) and a southern continent (Hespagorat). Helliconia Spring and Helliconia Summer mainly take place in Campannlat, with its rich vitality; Helliconia Winter focuses on Sibornal, where the harsher environment encourages technological progress. The southern continent features only briefly in the books.

Biology
The trilogy describes a variety of imagined plants and animals, and how they cope with the extremes of the climate. The most memorable is Wutra's Worm, an immense creature whose life span matches the great year, the Helliconia equivalent of a dragon. In the summer the young worms fly in the air, and in the winter the now-wingless mature worms live in a great network of tunnels beneath the surface.

Phagors
Phagors, also called ancipitals (meaning "double-edged", in reference to their horns), are white-furred humanoid beings, roughly the size of humans but with features resembling the mythical minotaur. They are intelligent, with their own language and culture, but their civilisation has never advanced beyond a hunter-gatherer level. Having evolved during Helliconia's earlier cold period, phagors are very different from humans in many ways: their blood is golden rather than red, their guts are located above their lungs, and they have an utterly alien intellect and psychology. They are described as hardy and long-lived, though not tolerant of warm conditions and water. If a phagor reaches great age, it begins to shrink and gradually becomes keratinised, so that it eventually resembles a small totem showing no outward signs of life. Living phagors continue to be able to communicate with the spirits of these keratinised ancestors by assuming a mental state called tether. When in tether, they perceive their ancestors as small quadrupedal sprites. These sprites, as ancestral spirits able to be contacted, fulfil the same role as the human "gossies" and "fessups".

Since the capture of the Helliconia system by Freyr and the subsequent evolution of humans, the two species have been in constant conflict, with the phagors dominant during the great winter and the humans dominant during the great summer. The slow swings in fortune between the two species are governed by the planet's climatic and biological cycles, rendering military conflicts between them essentially irrelevant. In a reversal of their original relationship, phagors are sometimes employed as soldiers or kept as slaves by humans, and humans are sometimes kept as slaves by phagors, during both seasons.

Humans
Phagors were the dominant race on Helliconia before the Helliconia-Batalix system was captured by Freyr. The increased temperatures caused by the new stellar configuration, it is implied, kick-started the evolution of humans on Helliconia. Before this, the ancestors of humans had been ape-like creatures sometimes kept as pets by the phagors. Because humans emerged after the solar system's capture by Freyr, the phagors call them "Sons of Freyr". Remnants of human evolution can be seen in the continued existence of several sub-human and semi-human species on Helliconia. The humans of Helliconia and those of Earth are therefore unrelated despite their apparent near-identity, products of convergent evolution.

By the end of each great autumn, humans have developed levels of civilization comparable at their most advanced to Renaissance Europe, with technology such as telescopes, map-making, and porcelain glass. However, each time the thousand-year great winter returns, human civilization inevitably regresses and has to be rebuilt again the next spring. The books hint that humans in some regions are becoming more competent at preserving knowledge and social structures through the winter, and that over the next few great years they may develop a scientific-industrial civilization capable of surviving throughout the great year, and thus completely dominating Helliconia.

Bone Fever and Fat Death
Bone Fever is a human viral disease characterized by an extreme form of anorexia, an epidemic of which sweeps the world early in the great spring. Fat Death is a disease characterized by an extreme form of binge eating, an epidemic of which sweeps the world late in the great autumn.

These two diseases cause great suffering and have very high mortality rates. However, the survivors are left with bodies which are respectively much thinner or fatter (and metabolically altered in other ways), and are therefore better adapted to the coming conditions of summer or winter, respectively. The two diseases are caused by the same virus, which is carried by ticks and is triggered by seasonal changes in the environment. The humans therefore have a symbiotic relationship with the virus and — unknowingly — with the phagors, who carry the ticks and hence the virus. Some rare people in remote areas are immune to the virus; these are considered ugly pariahs by the majority of the population, as they are horribly fat or thin compared to the prevailing standard.

The virus, while essential for human survival on Helliconia, is fatal year-round to the Earth-humans aboard Avernus, who have no natural defenses against it. Nonetheless, many inhabitants of Avernus choose to enter a lottery in which they can win the chance to visit the planet's surface and interact with the population, knowing that the deadly disease will kill them within a matter of days.

The Original Beholder
Just as Earth in the novels is sustained by Gaia, the Earth-mother force, Helliconia is tended by a similar yet separate entity referred to as the "Original Beholder" (or in Helliconia Spring the "Original Boulder"). A striking difference between Earth-humans and Helliconian humans (and phagors) is the latter's ability to communicate with the spirits of the dead as their life force is slowly returned to the Original Beholder. Both humans and phagors can enter a sort of shamanistic trance allowing this direct communication, a state which the humans call pauk and the phagors call tether. Recently deceased human spirits are called "gossies"; those of more ancient demise are "fessups".

A plot point in the trilogy (first described in Helliconia Spring, and explained in detail in Helliconia Winter) is the changing character of the pauk experience for the Helliconian humans. The spirits of the dead are described as extremely emotional, and constantly bitter and angry toward the visiting spirits of the living. After humans on Earth become interested in Helliconian civilization, a planet-wide effort is made on Earth to psychically transmit empathic energy from Gaia to the Original Beholder, in order to lend support to the humans on Helliconia. This effort has a positive effect on the spirits of the dead Helliconians, making them happier and more nurturing toward the living.

Plot summaries

Helliconia Spring
Helliconia Spring is set in the central region of the tropical continent, Campannlat. It is divided into two parts. The "prelude", entitled Yuli, is set during the Great Winter and follows the story of one man from youth into adulthood; this takes up about a quarter of the book. The remainder of the story, Embruddock, spans nearly 30 Helliconian years (about 40 Earth years) and documents the coming of the Great Spring. This narrative traces the intertwined lives of many people and the changes in their society as the climate warms, setting these events within the overarching framework of the planet's natural cycles.

Prelude: Yuli 
The prelude takes place about a century before the end of the Great Winter. While on a hunting expedition, a youth named Yuli and his father are ambushed by phagors. His father is taken as a slave, and Yuli is forced to head south in search of food and shelter. He makes his way to Pannoval, a city built within a vast cavern system. Pannoval is ruled despotically by an alliance of the priesthood and militia, who keep the citizens oppressed in the name of the god Akha. Yuli is converted to the religion of Akha and is initiated into the priesthood, which involves years of work and study as an acolyte.

As a newly ordained priest, he is sent to work with imprisoned criminals, who are used as slaves to excavate new living areas for the city until they are either executed or worked to death. His main task is to conduct interrogations and extract confessions from the prisoners. Yuli comes to realise just how corrupt the ruling class of Pannoval is, loses his faith, and becomes determined to return to the outside world. He seizes his chance when the prisoners' excavation work causes a cave-in. In the confusion, he escapes along with two prisoners and the former girlfriend of one of them. After a long and terrifying journey through underground passages, they finally emerge some distance to the south.

Yuli and his companions find a small, primitive settlement near a frozen lake, and soon come to rule it thanks to their superior knowledge and bold authority. Soon afterwards they extend their rule to a neighbouring tribe. Yuli spends the rest of his life as a revered priest-ruler in this area, which he names Oldorando.

Embruddock 
Yuli's tribe continues to live in the area near the lake for two generations until, having been warned of an impending phagor raid, the entire tribe flees south. To their amazement, they discover a relatively advanced town called Embruddock, the remnant of what had been the capital of an empire during the previous Great Summer (although this history is long forgotten). This place has the advantage of being situated in a geothermally active area, which has provided just enough warmth throughout the Great Winter that Embruddock has retained some fragments of its former culture (mainly in the skills and records of the craftsmens' guilds and in the stone towers).

Yuli's tribe attacks Embruddock and takes it over, renaming it Oldorando, and Yuli's family line is established as the local lords. A few years after this event, the town is attacked by a company of phagors. The phagor captain, a noble of his kind, is captured and executed. Some thirteen years (about nineteen Earth years) after that, the grandson of the phagor captain assembles a huge army which begins marching on Oldorando intent on revenge, a journey which will take a further thirteen years.

About ten years after the execution of the phagor captain, the Great Spring has begun and Helliconia has warmed enough that changes are beginning to be noticeable. Waterways are thawing, plants sprout in sheltered areas, and the weather becomes damp and unpredictable. Master hunter Aoz Roon, an Embruddock native, secretly murders the Oldorandan rulers and becomes the new lord of the city. Laintal Ay, the last of the Oldorandan lineage, witnesses the murders but keeps quiet out of fear; he becomes one of Aoz Roon's lieutenants.

A strong-minded woman named Shay Tal argues for increased rights for women. She also begins to realise that the population is slowly recovering from some ancient catastrophe. She exhorts the people to seek knowledge and sets up an academy, originally for women only. Aoz Roon, who is a brutal and unimaginative man, opposes this. A guildmaster, defying the guild laws of secrecy, reveals to Shay Tal that the guilds have kept records for centuries, although many books have been destroyed. These records reveal that the climate was once much colder, and hint at a warm period even longer ago, a tale widely regarded as myth.

Shay Tal realises that vast amounts of knowledge have been lost over the generations. As she continues her research into the history of Embruddock, she discovers that during the hardest depths of the Great Winter, phagors ruled the area and enslaved humanity. Humans came to worship their oppressors, and their god Wutra is nothing but a distorted image of a phagor chief. Shay Tal's main disciple, a woman named Vry, disagrees with this obsession with history and urges the academy to study the movements of the stars and think more about the future than the past. She and other students begin mapping the sky and determining the movements of the heavenly bodies. They calculate that the two suns, Batalix and Freyr, will soon begin a series of eclipses, an event noted in old records as an evil omen.

Helliconia continues to grow warmer. New plant and animal species are appearing, human populations are growing and spreading, and phagor populations are retreating to colder regions – except for the great phagor army which continues its march towards Oldorando. The population of the city continues to increase. As the town grows crops and domesticates animals, the work of survival becomes easier, the people begin to take an interest in leisure and luxury, and the town's defences grow weak. The first eclipse occurs, indicating the astronomical beginning of the Great Spring and causing widespread panic. The people of Oldorando learn to domesticate and breed hoxneys, horse-like animals which have emerged with the coming of the Great Spring. The ability to ride hoxneys and use them to power simple machinery triggers a great societal revolution, and Oldorando expands rapidly. As the climate improves and people begin to travel more widely, the city's location makes it an attractive hub, and it develops into a trading centre.

Observers from Earth, orbiting Helliconia in the space station Avernus, watch the coming of the Great Spring with interest. Among other phenomena, they follow the spread of the viral disease called bone fever, which inevitably strikes the human population at about the time of the spring eclipses, spread by the bite of phagor ticks. Although the disease causes severe suffering and death across the planet, it is necessary for the human species, because it causes its survivors to become adapted to the new warmer climate.

Oldorando has now grown into a wealthy, bustling bazaar city, attracting traders and travellers from far across the continent. Its old culture, dating from the Great Winter and simple tribal survival, is no longer suitable for this new, more sophisticated society. Political stresses become evident as the city is forced to adopt new customs such as the use of money. Shay Tal leaves to seek a "great wheel" in the northern continent of Sibornal, which she believes holds supreme knowledge. Aoz Roon escorts her out of Oldorandan territory, and on the way back is ambushed by phagors. While he fights one of the phagors hand-to-hand, they are swept into a flooded river and stranded together on an island. There he contracts bone fever.

Meanwhile, the bone fever epidemic has reached Oldorando, brought by incoming traders. Aoz Roon remains absent for many months, and two of his lieutenants try to seize power. Between the political wrangling and the terrors of the epidemic, Oldorandan society begins to fall apart. Laintal Ay leaves, ostensibly to search for Aoz Roon but actually because he can no longer stand life in the corrupt  city. He makes his way north and encounters a town settled by people who have migrated south from icy Sibornal. They have learned to coexist with phagors by trading captive slaves in return for safe passage.

Laintal Ay, who by this time has contracted and survived bone fever, is accepted into the town and given work overseeing the prisoner-slaves. He discovers that Shay Tal was previously captured and sold on, and then learns of the massive phagor army, which by now is almost upon them. He arranges with a disaffected Sibornalan guard to flee the town and return to Oldorando, hoping to get there in time to warn them of the phagor horde. Just as they prepare to leave, a weakened Aoz Roon is brought into the city as a captive; he joins the escaping group. Approaching Oldorando, they meet a handful of refugees fleeing for their lives. As the suns rise in a day-long eclipse, the phagor army attacks Oldorando and burns the city to the ground.

Helliconia Summer
Set during high summer in the tropical continent, Campannlat. Yuli's settlement is now the capital city of a great empire. Meanwhile, the residents of Avernus are holding occasional lotteries to ameliorate their ennui, the winners being allowed to go down to Helliconia and experience a short period of "real life" before succumbing to the Bone Fever/Fat Death virus. Despite the fatal consequences, the chance of visiting the planet's surface and interacting with its people is considered a great adventure, and the lotteries are popular. One winner, Billy Xiao Pin, gets involved in high politics, with messy consequences.

Helliconia Winter
Set during late autumn in the northern continent, Sibornal. The book's protagonist, Luterin Shokerandit, is the son of the Keeper of the Wheel of Kharnabar, located above the far north of Helliconia. The Wheel is an extraordinary revolving monastery/prison built into a ring-shaped tunnel with a single entrance and exit, powered entirely by the efforts of the prisoners pulling it along by means of chains set into the outer wall. Once a prisoner enters a cell of the Wheel, it is impossible for him to leave until its full ten-year rotation has passed.

Luterin joins the army, where he gains renown by killing the commandant of an enemy battalion, taking his widow Toress Lahl as a slave. Soon, however, the first cases of Fat Death begin to appear in the Sibornalese army. The Oligarch, autocratic ruler of Sibornal, orders other troops to destroy this army in an attempt to halt the spread of the epidemic. Luterin is warned by Captain Fashnalgid in time for the two of them to escape with Toress Lahl and a foreign trader who has arranged for a ship to flee the area. While the ship is at sea, the Fat Death spreads among those aboard; however, thanks to the skills of Toress Lahl, who was trained as a doctor, the major characters survive. It is during this voyage that a great deal of information is discovered about the deep past of the Helliconia-Batalix solar system, its capture by Freyr, and the intertwined fates of humans and phagors.

After the ship lands, the Oligarch's army continues to pursue the deserters. They go on the run again, hiring a dog-sledge with a semi-human driver and his phagor slave in order to cross the mountains. Fashnalgid mortally offends their driver by sleeping with his wife, and the driver retaliates by arranging for his phagor to push Fashnalgid off the sledge while they are travelling through a dangerous tunnel. Luterin tries to save Fashnalgid, but also falls from the sledge. He is forced to walk for miles through the polar cold until he eventually rejoins the sledge and is able to travel the rest of the way to his father's estate.

Once home, Luterin proclaims that he wishes to marry Toress Lahl rather than his arranged noble bride, and gives Toress the key to an ancient shrine. A few days later, he expresses hatred for the Oligarch who ordered his army to be destroyed. From his father's reactions, he realises that his father is in fact the Oligarch. Luterin kills his father and flees to the Wheel of Kharnabar; he enters the Wheel and therefore remains in solitary confinement for ten years. When he at last emerges, he finds that the assassination of the former Oligarch is now seen as a positive event.

A party is arranged to celebrate Luterin's freedom and also to observe the day of Myrkwyr, when Freyr is seen for the last time, marking the beginning of the centuries-long great winter. After the festivities, the Master of Kharnabar has Luterin seized, with the intent of throwing him back into the Wheel. For phagors, Myrkwyr indicates the return of conditions favourable to their kind, and a phagor tribe makes plans to regain their dominance over humans. The phagors attack the party; Luterin escapes in the confusion and is reunited with Toress Lahl. The book ends as they leave for the shrine, where she has been living in hiding with their now ten-year-old son.

References and annotations

External links
 Listen to Brian Aldiss discuss Helliconia Spring – a British Library recording
 Contemporary review of Helliconia Spring, UK magazine: Extro 3, July/August 1982
 Physics of Helliconia
 Helliconia How & Why By Brian Aldiss
 Helliconia on the official Brian Aldiss website
 Brian Aldiss's papers concerning the Helliconia Trilogy are housed at the Kenneth Spencer Research Library at the University of Kansas

1980s science fiction novels
British science fiction novels
Novels by Brian Aldiss
Novels set on fictional planets
Science fiction novel trilogies